Uni or UNI may refer to:

Entertainment
Uni Records, a division of MCA, formally called Universal City Records
"U.N.I.", a song by Ed Sheeran from + (Plus)
Uni, a species in the Neopets Trading Card Game
Uni, a character in the anime Reborn!
Uni, a character in the television series Dungeons and Dragons
Uni, a fictional character in the Hyperdimension Neptunia Mk2 video game

Organizations
UNI Financial Cooperation, a Canadian credit union
Ente Nazionale Italiano di Unificazione, an Italian technical standards organization
UNI global union, an international trade union federation
 The University of Northern Iowa, a university in the United States
 The National University of Engineering, a university in Peru
 UNI, an alternative name for the Northern Iowa Panthers, the athletic program of the University of Northern Iowa
United News of India, an Indian news agency
National Union of Independents (disambiguation), the name of several political parties

Transport
UNI, the reporting mark of Unity Railways, a defunct Pennsylvania railroad
UNI, the MTR station code for University station, Hong Kong

Other uses
 Uni, a colloquial term for university
Uni (food), sea urchin in Japanese cuisine
Uni (letter), a glyph in Georgian scripts
Uni (mythology), the supreme goddess of Etruscan mythology
Uni (inhabited locality), name of several places in Russia
Uni language, a language of Papua New Guinea
uni-ball, brand of pens and pencils made by the Mitsubishi Pencil Company
In mathematics, the category of uniform spaces
User–network interface, the junction from which a telecommunications service is connected between the service provider and the end user
UNI, fashion denotes unisex clothing
Uni, a uniformed police officer in law enforcement jargon
UNI, the governance token of the Uniswap cryptocurrency exchange

See also
Unis (disambiguation)
Unni (disambiguation)
Uny